"By My Side" is a single by Australian band INXS, the third UK single and fourth Australian single taken from their seventh studio album, X (1990). The song was written by Andrew Farriss and Kirk Pengilly as part of the 1990 sessions for the X album. Record producer Chris Thomas, who produced the album, is also given songwriting credits, specifically contributing to the chorus and arrangement, as explained in the liner notes for the X album special edition in 2002. Farriss has said "By My Side" was written about missing family and friends while touring.

"By My Side" peaked at number 42 on the UK Singles Chart, which was the band's poorest chart performance since first breaking into the UK top 40 with "New Sensation" in 1988. Along with "Never Tear Us Apart", "By My Side" was one of two INXS songs played at the funeral of frontman Michael Hutchence following his death on 22 November 1997. In February 2014, after the Channel 7 screening of INXS: Never Tear Us Apart mini-series, the song charted again in Australia through download sales, peaking at number 67 on the ARIA Singles Chart.

B-sides
The three B-sides are a David Morales remix of their previous hit, "Disappear" and two band solo compositions: "The Other Side", written and performed by guitarist and saxophonist, Kirk Pengilly, and "Soothe Me", written and performed by guitarist and keyboard player, Andrew Farriss.

Track listings

UK 7-inch and cassette single
 "By My Side" (LP version)
 "The Other Side"

UK 12-inch single
 "By My Side" (The Movie mix)
 "The Other Side"
 "Faith in Each Other" (live)

UK CD single
 "By My Side" (LP version)
 "The Other Side"
 "Faith in Each Other" (live)
 "Disappear" (Morales remix)

 Japanese maxi-CD and Australian CD poster pack
 "By My Side" (The Movie mix)
 "By My Side" (LP version)
 "Soothe Me"
 "Faith in Each Other" (live)

 Australian cassette maxi-single
 "By My Side" (Movie mix) 
 "By My Side" (LP version) 
 "Soothe Me" 
 "Faith in Each Other" (live)

Charts

References

INXS songs
1990 songs
1991 singles
Atlantic Records singles
Song recordings produced by Chris Thomas (record producer)
Songs written by Andrew Farriss
Songs written by Chris Thomas (record producer)
Songs written by Michael Hutchence